Feeling Sensation is the first single album from South Korean boy band SF9. It was released on October 5, 2016, by FNC Entertainment. The album consists of three tracks, including the title track, "Fanfare".

Commercial performance
The EP sold 32,322+ copies in South Korea. It peaked at number 6 on the Korean Gaon Chart.

Track listing

References

2016 albums
SF9 (band) albums
FNC Entertainment albums
Kakao M albums
Single albums